Waghäusel (South Franconian: Woghaisl) is a town located in the Rhine valley in the south-western state of Baden-Württemberg, Germany. Waghäusel consists of 3 townships which are the core town (1236 residents), Kirrlach (9347 residents), and Wiesental (9596 residents) [as of March 31, 2006]. Wiesental and Kirrlach are located on Bertha Benz Memorial Route.

Among the 3 townships, Wiesental occupies the largest land area of 21.2 km² followed by Kirrlach with 19.4 km² and the core town with 0.22 km².

Sights
 Pilgrimage church of Mary with monastery
 Baroque castle "Eremitage"
 Daytaller House in Kirrlach
 Gothic wood carved altar in the Catholic Church of Kirrlach
 Old-German wine tavern in Kirrlach (liquor license since July 15, 1700)

International relations

Waghäusel is twinned with the following towns:
  Caldicot, Wales
  Flattach, Austria
  Szigetújfalu, Hungary

References

External links
  Official Waghäusel web site
  Pilgrimage church of Mary with monastery

Karlsruhe (district)